Sebrovo is an urban locality (an urban-type settlement) in Volgograd Oblast, Russia. Population:

References

Urban-type settlements in Volgograd Oblast